Gnau is a language of Papua New Guinea.  It is part of the Torricelli language family.

References

Wapei languages
Languages of Sandaun Province